was born on June 21, 1884 in Kawashiri, Kōzan Town, Sera County, Hiroshima Prefecture, the third daughter of . After studying at Kawashiri Elementary School, Hongo Middle School, and the Kozan Needlecraft School, she found employment at a local elementary school.

In 1901 she moved to Tokyo and enrolled in Wayo Women's University, subsequently taking a teaching position in Kanagawa Prefecture.

In 1907 she married , an employee of the Imperial Household Ministry. With his help and support, she founded a needlecraft school in Chiyoda, Tokyo, a stone's throw from the Imperial Palace (Kokyo). This school later developed into the Otsuma Girls' Middle and High Schools and Otsuma Women's University and Junior College.

In 1952 she founded the Kozan Art and Craft High School and remained its head until her death.

Otsuma died on January 3, 1970.

Otsuma is widely regarded as one of the pioneers of women's education in Japan, even though the curricula of her schools emphasized home economics and traditional social values. Her connections to the Imperial Palace and her active support of the militaristic government led to her being investigated after the Pacific War, but no action was taken. Conversely, her contributions to Japanese education were recognized by the following Imperial Awards:

1954　Medal with Blue Ribbon (藍綬褒章, ranjuhōshō)
1964　Order of the Precious Crown, Butterfly (宝冠白蝶章, hōkanshirochōshō)
1970　Order of the Sacred Treasure, Gold and Silver Star (瑞宝重光章, zuihōjūkōshō)

In 2002 she was posthumously made an Honorary Citizen of Kozan Town.

External links 
Otsuma Women's University
Otsuma Kotaka Memorial Association De facto alumni association.
Kozan Town Web Site Celebrations of the 120th Anniversary of Otsuma Kotaka's birth.

1884 births
1970 deaths
Japanese educators
People from Hiroshima Prefecture
Japanese women educators
University and college founders
Women founders